Haenkea is a genus of beetles in the family Cerambycidae, containing the following species:

 Haenkea atra (Chevrolat, 1855)
 Haenkea thoracica (Chevrolat, 1855)
 Haenkea zischkai Tippmann, 1953

References

Rhopalophorini